Counterintelligence Service may refer to:

 Counterintelligence Corps (United States Army) (1917-1961)
 KOS (Yugoslavia), the Kontraobavještajna služba, the counterintelligence service of the Yugoslav People's Army
 MI5, the United Kingdom's internal counterintelligence and security agency
 Internal Counter-Intelligence Service, fictional British military organization from the UNIT audio plays by Big Finish

See also
 Counterintelligence
 List of counterintelligence organizations